Eneko Atxa Azurmendi (born September 14, 1977) is a Spanish Basque cuisine chef. A three-star Michelin restaurant owner, Atxa was initially trained by his mother and grandmother and thereafter with Martin Berasategui. He opened his restaurant with his uncle Gorka Izaguirre.

In 2016, Atxa opened a restaurant in the UK.

Kitchen sustainability 
In conjunction with the Alicia Foundation and University of the Basque Country, he is working on germplasm bank which will host 400+ local vegetable seed varieties with an emphasis on teaching about the value of genetic diversity preservation.  Located in the Interpretation Center for Sustainability of Arzak it was promoted by the City Council of Larrabetzu as a way of establishing a circular economic system with the use of a generated compost by local farmers that acts as a land fertilizer.

In 2012 he finished a bioclimatic building for his restaurant using recycled materials (aluminium, glass, plastic and slag) and renewable energy systems (which has resulted in 50% energy savings). Geothermal energy and photovoltaic solar panels provide the power and rainwater is used for all irrigation/bathroom needs.

Awards 

Signature Cuisine Champion of Spain for Young Chefs in 2003
 The Haute Cuisine for Young Chefs Award (Lo Mejor de la Gastronomia) in 2004
 Best Newcomer Restaurant in Madrid Fusión in 2006
 Euskadi Award for Best Chef of the Year in 2007
 Healthy Cuisine Award from the Galician Gastronomic Forum in 2008
 The Prix du Chef L’Avenir (International Academy of Gastronomy) in 2010
 3 Michelín Stars (2012)
 Young Chef of the Year (Elite Traveler) in 2015
 World’s Most Sustainable Restaurant Award (World’s 50 Best Restaurants/Sustainable Restaurant Association) 2014, 2018 and 2019
 Westholme Highest Climber Award (2019)

References

External links 
 

Basque cuisine
Head chefs of Michelin starred restaurants
Spanish chefs
1977 births
Living people